Israel Finkelstein (born March 29, 1949) is an Israeli archaeologist, professor emeritus at Tel Aviv University and the head of the School of Archaeology and Maritime Cultures at the University of Haifa. Finkelstein is active in the archaeology of the Levant and is an applicant of archaeological data in reconstructing biblical history. He is also known for applying the exact and life sciences in archaeological and historical reconstruction. Finkelstein is the current excavator of Megiddo, a key site for the study of the Bronze and Iron Ages in the Levant.

Finkelstein is a member of the Israel Academy of Sciences and Humanities and an associé étranger of the French Académie des Inscriptions et Belles-Lettres. Finkelstein has received several noteworthy academic and writing awards. In 2005, he won the Dan David Prize for his revision of the history of Israel in the 10th and 9th centuries BCE. In 2009 he was named chevalier of the Ordre des Arts et des Lettres by the French Minister of Culture, and in 2010, received a doctorate honoris causa from the University of Lausanne. He is a member of the selection committee of the Shanghai Archaeology Forum, the Chinese Academy of Social Sciences.

Among Finkelstein's books are The Bible Unearthed: Archaeology's New Vision of Ancient Israel and the Origin of its Sacred Texts (2001) and David and Solomon: In Search of the Bible's Sacred Kings and the Roots of the Western Tradition (2006), both written with Neil Asher Silberman. Also he wrote the textbooks on the emergence of Ancient Israel, titled The Archaeology of the Israelite Settlement (1988); on the archaeology and history of the arid zones of the Levant, titled Living on the Fringe (1995); and on the Northern Kingdom of Israel, titled The Forgotten Kingdom (2013).

Background

Family 
Israel Finkelstein was born to an Ashkenazi Jewish family in Tel Aviv, Israel, on March 29, 1949. His parents were Zvi (Grisha) Finkelstein (born 1908) and Miriam Finkelstein (maiden name Ellenhorn, born 1910). His great grandfather on his mother's side, Shlomo Ellenhorn, came to Palestine from Grodno (today in Belarus) in the 1850s and settled in Hebron. He was one of the first physicians in the Bikur Cholim Hospital in Jerusalem, and is listed among the group of people who purchased the land in 1878 in order to establish Petah Tikva – the first modern Jewish settlement in Palestine outside the four holy cities. Finkelstein's grandfather, Israel Jacob Ellenhorn, was the first pharmacist in Petah Tikva.

Finkelstein’s father was born in Melitopol (Ukraine). He came to Palestine with his family in 1920. He was in the orange-growing business and was active in the sports organisations of Israel. He served as vice chairman of the Israel Football Association, chairman of Maccabi Israel and was a member of the Israel Olympic Committee.

Finkelstein is married to Joelle (maiden name Cohen). They are the parents of two daughters – Adar (born 1992) and Sarai (born 1996).

Education
Israel Finkelstein attended the PICA elementary school (1956–1963) and Ahad Ha'am High School (1963–1967), both in Petah Tikva. He then served in the Israel Defense Forces (1967–1970). He studied archaeology and Near Eastern civilizations, and geography at Tel Aviv University, receiving his BA in 1974. While there, Finkelstein was a student of Prof. Yohanan Aharoni. He continued as a research student under the supervision of Prof. Moshe Kochavi, receiving his MA in 1978 (thesis on Rural Settlement in the Yarkon Basin in the Iron Age and Persian-Hellenistic Periods). He graduated as a PhD in 1983 with a thesis titled "The Izbet Sartah Excavations and the Israelite Settlement in the Hill Country".

Academic career 
From 1976 to 1990, Finkelstein taught at the Department of Land of Israel Studies, Bar-Ilan University, beginning as a teaching assistant. He spent the academic year of 1983–84 in a research group led by Prof. Yigael Yadin in the Institute of Advanced Studies in the Hebrew University, Jerusalem. In 1986 and 1987, Finkelstein taught at the Department for Near Eastern Languages and Civilizations, University of Chicago. In 1987 he was appointed an associate professor with tenure at Bar-Ilan University and in 1990 moved to the Department of Archaeology and Ancient Near Eastern Civilizations at Tel Aviv University. In 1992/93 Finkelstein spent a sabbatical year as a visiting scholar at the Department of Near Eastern Languages and Civilizations, Harvard University. Since 1992, he has been a Full Professor at Tel Aviv University. He served as the chairperson of the Department of Archaeology and Near Eastern Studies (1994–98) and as Director of The Sonia and Marco Nadler Institute of Archaeology (1996–2003). In 1998–99 Finkelstein was a visiting scholar in the Centre de Recherche d’Archéologie Orientale and the École Pratique des Hautes Études in the Sorbonne, Paris.

Finkelstein delivered series of lectures on the history and archaeology of Ancient Israel at the Texas Christian University (2002), the University of Buenos Aires (2011), the College de France in Paris (2012) and the Methodist University of São Paulo (2015), the Tokyo Christian University (2017), the Pontifical Biblical Institute in Rome (2017) and the University of Zurich (2018). Finkelstein has read over 100 papers in international conferences and given numerous talks in universities around the globe.

Finkelstein has been the Editor of Tel Aviv, the journal of the Institute of Archaeology of Tel Aviv University, since 2008 and Executive Editor of the Monograph Series by the Institute of Archaeology, Tel Aviv University, since 2005. He is a member of editorial boards, including the Palestine Exploration Quarterly and the Archaeology and Biblical Studies series of the Society of Biblical Literature.

Fieldwork 

Finkelstein was trained as a field archaeologist in the excavations of Tel Beer Sheva (1971, Director: Yohanan Aharoni) and Tel Aphek (1973–1978, Directors: Moshe Kochavi and Pirhiya Beck). Starting in 1976, he carried out his own fieldwork in a variety of sites and regions:

Past excavations and surveys 
‘Izbet Sartah, 1976–1978: Field Director (under Prof. Moshe Kochavi) of excavations at ‘Izbet Sartah, an Iron I-Iron IIA village-site near Rosh Ha‘ayin, east of Tel Aviv. For the results see: I. Finkelstein, Izbet Sartah: An Early Iron Age Site near Rosh Ha‘ayin, Israel, Oxford 1986 (BAR International Series 299).

Southern Sinai, 1976–1978: Surveys of Byzantine monastic remains in southern Sinai. For the results see: I. Finkelstein, Byzantine Monastic Remains in Southern Sinai, Dumbarton Oaks Papers 39 (1985), pp. 39–75.

Bene Beraq, 1977: Director of salvage excavations at the mound of ancient Bene Beraq near Tel Aviv. For the results see: I. Finkelstein, Soundings at Ancient Bene-Beraq, ‘Atiqot 10 (1990), pp. 29–40 (Hebrew).

Tel Ira, 1980: Co-Director of the excavations of the Iron II site of Tel Ira in the Beer-sheba Valley (together with I. Beit-Arieh and B. Cresson). For the results see: I. Finkelstein and I. Beit-Arieh, Area E, in I. Beit-Arieh (ed.), Tel Ira: A Stronghold in the Biblical Negev (monograph Series of the Institute of Archaeology Tel Aviv University 15), Tel Aviv 1999, pp. 67–96.

Shiloh, 1981–1984: Director of the excavations at biblical Shiloh in the highlands north of Jerusalem. The site features Middle Bronze, Late Bronze and Iron I remains. For the results see: I. Finkelstein (ed.), Shiloh: The Archaeology of a Biblical Site (Monograph Series of the Institute of Archaeology Tel Aviv University 10), Tel Aviv 1993.

Southern Samaria Survey, 1981–1987: Director of the survey, ca. 1000 km2. in the highlands north of Jerusalem. For the results see: I. Finkelstein, Z. Lederman and S. Bunimovitz, Highlands of Many Cultures, The Southern Samaria Survey, The Sites (Monograph Series of the Institute of Archaeology Tel Aviv University 14). Tel Aviv

Khirbet ed-Dawwara, 1985–86: Director, excavations at Khirbet ed-Dawwara, an Iron I-early Iron IIA site in the desert fringe northeast of Jerusalem. For the results see: I. Finkelstein, Excavations at Kh. ed-Dawwara: An Iron Age Site Northeast of Jerusalem, Tel Aviv 17 (1990), pp. 163–208.

Dhahr Mirzbaneh, 1987: Sounding at the Intermediate Bronze site of Dhahr Mirzbaneh in the desert fringe northeast of Jerusalem. For the results see: I. Finkelstein, The Central Hill Country in the Intermediate Bronze Age, Israel Exploration Journal 41 (1991), pp. 19–45.

Present excavations 
Megiddo, 1994–present: co-Director, the Megiddo Excavations (1994–2012 with David Ussishkin, since 2014 with Matthew J. Adams and Mario A.S. Martin). Megiddo is considered as one of the most important Bronze and Iron Age sites in the Levant. For the results see: I. Finkelstein, D. Ussishkin and B. Halpern (eds.), Megiddo III: The 1992–1996 Seasons (Monograph Series of the Institute of Archaeology Tel Aviv University 18). Tel Aviv 2000. I. Finkelstein, D. Ussishkin and B. Halpern (eds.), Megiddo IV: The 1998–2002 Seasons (Monograph Series of the Institute of Archaeology Tel Aviv University 24), Tel Aviv 2006. I. Finkelstein, D. Ussishkin and E.H. Cline (editors), Megiddo V: The 2004–2008 Seasons (Monograph Series of the Institute of Archaeology Tel Aviv University 31), Winona Lake 2013. I. Finkelstein, M.A.S. Martin and M.J. Adams (eds.), Megiddo VI: The 2010–2014 Seasons (forthcoming).

The Negev Highlands, 2006–present: co-Director of excavations in the Iron Age sites of Atar Haroa and Nahal Boqer, and the Intermediate Bronze Age sites of Mashabe Sade and En Ziq (with Ruth Shahack-Gross). For the results see: R. Shahack-Gross and I. Finkelstein, Settlement Oscillations in the Negev Highlands Revisited: The Impact of Microarchaeological Methods, Radiocarbon 57/2 (2015), pp. 253–264.

Kiriath-Jearim, 2017–present: co-Director, the Shmunis Family excavations at Kiriath-Jearim – a biblical site in the highlands west of Jerusalem associated with the Ark Narrative in the Book of Samuel (with Christophe Nicolle and Thomas Römer, the College de France).

Other projects

In the past 
 1997–2002: Petrographic study of the Amarna tablets (with Yuval Goren and Nadav Na'aman). For the results see: Y. Goren, I. Finkelstein and N. Na'aman, Inscribed in Clay: Provenance Study of the Amarna Letters and other Ancient Near Eastern Texts (Monograph Series of the Institute of Archaeology Tel Aviv University 23), Tel Aviv 2004.
 2009–2014: Principal Investigator of a European Research Council-funded project titled Reconstructing Ancient Israel: The Exact and Life Sciences Perspectives (with Steve Weiner, Weizmann Institute of Science, co-Principal Investigator). The project was organized into 10 tracks: Radiocarbon dating, ancient DNA, geoarchaeology, paleoclimate, petrography, metallurgy, daily mathematics, advanced imaging of ostraca, residue analysis and archaeozoology. Over 40 scholars, advanced students and post-docs were involved in the project. Samples were taken from a large number of sites in Israel and Greece. For the results see: I. Finkelstein, S. Weiner and E. Boaretto (eds.), Reconstructing Ancient Israel: The Exact and Life Sciences Perspectives, special issue of Radiocarbon (57/2), 2015, with a list of all publications until 2015.
Paleoclimate of the Levant (2009-2019), with Dafna Langgut (Tel Aviv University) and Thomas Litt (University of Bonn).
The Archaeological and Historical Realities behind the Pentateuch (2016-2019), with Konrad Schmid (University of Zurich), Thomas Römer and Christophe Nihan (University of Lausanne) and Oded Lipschits (Tel Aviv University).

Ongoing research projects 
 Geoarchaeological Investigations in the Negev Highlands (2006-) with Ruth Shahack-Gross (University of Haifa).
 Iron Age Hebrew Ostraca in the Silicon Age: Computerized Paleography (2008-), directed with Eli Piasetzky (Tel Aviv University). For results see list of publications in http://www-nuclear.tau.ac.il/~eip/ostraca/Publications/Publications.html
 Ancient DNA, animals and Humans (2009-), with Meirav Meiri (Tel Aviv University); current cooperation with Joseph Maran and Philipp Stockhammer (Universities of Heidelberg and Munich), Liran Carmel (Hebrew University) and David Reich (Harvard University).

Scholarly contributions 
Finkelstein has written on a variety of topics, including the archaeology of the Bronze Age and the exact and life sciences contribution to archaeology. Much of his work has been devoted to the Iron Age and, more specifically, to questions related to the history of Ancient Israel.

The emergence of Ancient Israel 
The classical theories on the emergence of Israel viewed the process as a unique event in the history of the region. Finkelstein suggested that we are dealing with a long-term process of a cyclical nature. He demonstrated that the wave of settlement in the highlands in the Iron Age I (ca. 1150-950 BCE) was the last in a series of such demographic developments – the first had taken place in the Early Bronze and the second in the Middle Bronze. The periods between these peaks were characterized by low settlement activity. Finkelstein explained these oscillations as representing changes along the sedentary/ pastoral-nomadic continuum, which were caused by socioeconomic and political dynamics. Hence, a big portion of the people who settled in the highlands in the early Iron Age were locals of a pastoral-nomadic background. Others, who originated from local sedentary background, moved to the highlands as a result of the Bronze Age collapse – which in turn was related to a long period of dry climate in ca. 1250-1100 BCE. Since eventually these groups formed the Northern Kingdom of Israel, they can be labeled "Israelites" as early as their initial settlement process. The same holds true for the contemporary settlement process in Transjordan and western Syria, which brought about the rise of Moab, Ammon and the Aramean kingdoms of the later phases of the Iron Age.

Finkelstein regards the biblical account on the Conquest of Canaan in the Book of Joshua as an ideological manifesto of the Deuteronomistic author/s of the late 7th century BCE, describing a "conquest to be" under King Josiah of Judah rather than a historical event at the end of the Bronze Age. He proposed that the original Conquest Account may have originated in the Northern Kingdom of Israel in the early 8th century BCE; it could have been influenced by memories of the turmoil that had taken place in the lowlands in the late Iron I (10th century BCE), rather than the end of the Late Bronze Age (late 12th century BCE).

The Low Chronology 
Until the 1990s, the chronology of the Iron Age in the Levant had been anchored in the biblical account of the great United Monarchy of David and Solomon. Accordingly, the Iron I ended ca. 1000 BCE and the Iron IIA was dated from 1000 BCE until the campaign of Pharaoh Sheshonq I (biblical Shishak) ca. 925 BCE. The two Iron IIA palaces at Megiddo were conceived as the material manifestation for the Solomonic Empire. While preparing for the excavations at Megiddo in the early 1990s, Finkelstein noticed difficulties in this scheme. Noteworthy among them is the appearance of similar traits of material culture at Megiddo in a layer that was dated to the time of King Solomon in the middle of the 10th century, and at Samaria and Jezreel in contexts dated to the time of the Omride Dynasty (of the Northern Kingdom of Israel) in the early 9th century BCE. To resolve these difficulties, Finkelstein proposed to "lower" the dates of the Iron Age strata in the Levant by several decades.

According to Finkelstein's Low Chronology, the Iron Age I lasted until the middle of the 10th century BCE, while the Iron IIA is dated between the middle of the 10th century and ca. 800 BCE, if not slightly later. This means that the Megiddo palaces and other features which had traditionally been attributed to the time of King Solomon – features which date to the late Iron IIA – should indeed be associated with the endeavors of the Omride Dynasty in the first half of the 9th century BCE. A big debate ensued. Starting in the late 1990s, the focus of the discussion shifted to the interpretation of radiocarbon determinations for organic samples from key sites, such as Tel Rehov and Megiddo. All in all, the radiocarbon results put the Iron I/IIA transition ca. the middle of the 10th century (rather than 1000 BCE as had traditionally been proposed), and the Iron IIA/B transition in the early days of the 8th century (rather than ca. 925 BCE).

In parallel, and not directly connected, Finkelstein dealt with the chronology of Philistine pottery of the Iron Age I. The traditional theory fixed the appearance of Philistine pottery – and hence the settlement of the Philistines in the southern coastal plain of the Levant – in accordance with the confrontation between Ramses III and the Sea Peoples in the early 12th century BCE. In other words, Philistine pottery appears during the last phase of Egyptian rule in Canaan. Finkelstein proposed that the locally-made Monochrome pottery known from several sites in Philistia, which is widely understood as representing the earliest phase of Philistine settlement, should be dated after the withdrawal of Egypt from Canaan in the 1130s.

Finkelstein sees the biblical description of the time of David and Solomon as multilayered. He acknowledges the historicity of the founders of the Davidic Dynasty, places them in the 10th century BCE, and considers the possibility that the description of the rise of David to power conceals old memories of his activity as a leader of an Apiru-band that was active in the southern fringe of Judah. Yet, he sees the description of a great United Monarchy as an ideological construct that represents the ideology of late-monarchic author/s in the late 7th century BCE, first and foremost the pan-Israelite ideology of the days of King Josiah of Judah. According to him, the historical David and Solomon ruled over a small territory in the southern highlands – a territory not very different from that of Jerusalem of the Late Bronze Age. Second, from the time of King Manasseh of Judah in the early 7th century BCE, under Assyrian domination (for instance, the visit of the Queen of Sheba in Jerusalem). He understands the description of the Philistines in the Bible as portraying realities in Philistia in late-monarchic times.

"New Canaan" 
Following the results of the excavations at Megiddo, Finkelstein argued that the material culture of the Iron I in the northern valleys continues that of the Late Bronze Age. In other words, the collapse of the Late Bronze city-states under Egyptian domination in the late 12th century BCE was followed by revival of some of the same centers and rise of others in the Iron I. He termed this phenomenon "New Canaan". Accordingly, the major break in the material culture of Canaan took place at the end of the Iron I in the 10th century BCE rather than the end of the Late Bronze Age. Finkelstein associated the violent destruction of the revived city-states with the expansion of the highlanders (early Israelites). He suggested that memories of the turmoil in the lowlands in the late Iron I can be found in northern traditions regarding skirmishes with Canaanite cities which appear in the heroic stories in the Book of Judges.

The Northern Kingdom 
Finkelstein dealt with a variety of themes related to the archeology and history of the Northern Kingdom of Israel. He proposed that the first North Israelite territorial polity emerged in the Gibeon-Bethel plateau in the late Iron I and early Iron IIA. He found archaeological evidence for this in the system of fortified sites, such as Tell en-Nasbeh, Khirbet ed-Dawwara, et-Tell ("Ai") and Gibeon. Historical evidence for the existence of this polity can be found in the campaign of Pharaoh Sheshonq I in this region in the middle-to-second half of the 10th century BCE. According to Finkelstein, positive memories in the Bible of the House of Saul, which originated from the North, represent this early Israelite entity. He suggested that this north Israelite polity ruled over much of the territory of the highlands, that it presented a threat to the interests of Egypt of the 22nd Dynasty in Canaan, and that it was taken over during the campaign of Sheshonq I.

Finkelstein proposed that in its early days, the Northern Kingdom (Jeroboam I and his successors) ruled over the Samaria Highlands, the western slopes of the Gilead and the area of the Jezreel Valley. The expansion of Israel further to the north came during the days of the Omride Dynasty in the first half of the 9th century BCE, and even more so in the time of Jeroboam II in the first half of the 8th century BCE. Finkelstein described the special features of Omride architecture and, with his Megiddo team, dealt with different subjects related to the material culture of the Northern Kingdom, such as metallurgy and cult practices.

Finkelstein also reflected on biblical traditions related to the Northern Kingdom, such as the Jacob cycle in Genesis (a study carried out with Thomas Römer), the Exodus tradition, the heroic stories in the Book of Judges and remnants of royal traditions in the Books of Samuel and Kings. He suggested that these North Israelite traditions were first committed to writing in the days of Jeroboam II (first half of the 8th century BCE), that they were brought to Judah with Israelite refugees after the takeover of Israel by Assyria, and that they were later incorporated into the Judahite-dominated Bible. Finkelstein sees the biblical genre of deploying "history" in the service of royal ideology as emerging from Israel (the North) of the 8th century BCE.

Archaeology and history of Jerusalem 
Finkelstein has recently dealt with the location of the ancient mound of Jerusalem (with Ido Koch and Oded Lipschits). The conventional wisdom sees that "City of David" ridge as the location of the original settlement of Jerusalem. Finkelstein and his colleagues argued that the "City of David" ridge does not have the silhouette of a mound; that it is located in topographical inferiority relative to the surrounding area; and that the archaeological record of the ridge does not include periods of habitation attested in reliable textual records. According to them, the most suitable location for the core of ancient Jerusalem is the Temple Mount. The large area of the Herodian platform (today's Harem esh-Sharif) may conceal a mound of five hectares and more, which – similar to other capital cities in the Levant – included both the royal compound and habitation quarters. Locating the mound of Ancient Jerusalem on the Temple Mount resolves many of the difficulties pertaining to the "City of David" ridge.

According to Finkelstein, the history of Jerusalem in biblical times should be viewed in terms of three main phases:

Firstly, until the 9th century BCE, Jerusalem was restricted to the mound on the Temple Mount and ruled over a modest area in the southern highlands. Accordingly, Jerusalem of the time of David and Solomon can be compared to Jerusalem of the Amarna period in the 14th century BCE: it had the size of a typical highlands mound (for instance, Shechem), ruled over a restricted area, but still had impact beyond the highlands.

Secondly, the first expansion of Jerusalem came in the 9th century BCE, perhaps in its second half, when the town grew significantly in a southerly direction. Remains of the Iron IIA were unearthed south of al-Aqsa Mosque, above the Gihon Spring and to the south of the Dung Gate of the Old City. In parallel to this development, Judah expanded to the Shephelah in the west and Beer-sheba Valley in the south, and for the first time became a territorial kingdom rather than a city-state restricted to the highlands.

Thirdly, the most impressive phase in the settlement history of Jerusalem commenced in the late 8th century BCE and lasted until its destruction by the Babylonians in 586 BCE. At that time Jerusalem expanded dramatically, to include the entire "City of David" ridge, as well as the "Western Hill" (the Armenian and Jewish Quarter of today's Old City). This expansion was the result of the arrival of Israelite refugees after the demise of the Northern Kingdom in 722-720 BCE. These groups brought with them traits of Northern material culture, and more important – their foundation myths, royal traditions and heroic stories. These Northern traditions were later incorporated into the Judahite Bible.

Jerusalem and Yehud/Judea of the Persian and Hellenistic periods 
Finkelstein noted that in the Persian Period, Jerusalem was limited to the mound on the Temple Mount – and even there was sparsely settled – and that Yehud of that time was also thinly settled. As the description of the construction of the wall of Jerusalem in Nehemiah 3 must relate to the big city (extending beyond the old mound on the Temple Mount), it probably portrays the construction of the fortifications by the Hasmoneans.

Finkelstein further noted that many of the sites mentioned in the lists of returnees in Ezra and Nehemiah were not inhabited in the Persian Period and hence sees these lists as reflecting the demographic situation in days of the Hasmoneans. The same holds true, in his opinion, for the genealogies in 1 Chronicles. Finkelstein then looked into the accounts of Judahite monarchs in 2 Chronicles, which do not appear in Kings. He called attention to similarities between these texts and 1 Maccabees, and proposed to understand Chronicles as representing legitimacy needs of the Hasmoneans. This means that at least 2 Chronicles dates to the late 2nd century BCE, probably to the days of John Hyrcanus.

Published works

Books 
In addition to the reports of excavations cited above:
 Sinai in Antiquity, Tel Aviv 1980 (ed., with Zeev Meshel, Hebrew)
 The Archaeology of the Israelite Settlement, Jerusalem 1988, 
 Archaeological Survey of the Hill Country of Benjamin, Jerusalem 1993,  (ed., with Yitzhak Magen)
 From Nomadism to Monarchy: Archaeological and Historical Aspects of Early Israel, Jerusalem 1994,  (ed., with Nadav Na'aman)
 Living on the Fringe: The Archaeology and History of the Negev, Sinai and Neighbouring Regions in the Bronze and Iron Ages, Sheffield 1995, 
 The Bible Unearthed: Archaeology's New Vision of Ancient Israel and the Origin of Its Sacred Texts, New York 2001  (with Neil Asher Silberman). Translated to 12 languages.
 David and Solomon: In Search of the Bible's Sacred Kings and the Roots of the Western Tradition, New York 2006,  (with Neil Asher Silberman). Translated to six languages.
 The Quest for the Historical Israel: Debating Archeology and the History of Early Israel, Atlanta 2007,  (with Amihai Mazar)
 Un archéologue au pays de la Bible, Paris 2008, 
 The Forgotten Kingdom. The Archaeology and History of Northern Israel, Atlanta 2013, . Translated to four languages.
Hasmonean Realities behind Ezra, Nehemiah and Chronicles, Atlanta 2018.
 Co-editor of three festschrifts – for Nadav Na'aman, David Ussishkin and Benjamin Sass.

Articles 
About 400 scholarly articles; for many of them see: https://telaviv.academia.edu/IsraelFinkelstein

Festschrift 
Bene Israel: Studies in the Archaeology of Israel and the Levant during the Bronze and Iron Ages in Honour of Israel Finkelstein, Leiden and London 2008 (eds. Alexander Fantalkin and Assaf Yasur-Landau).

Rethinking Israel: Studies in the History and Archaeology of Ancient Israel in Honor of Israel Finkelstein, Winona Lake 2017 (eds. Oded Lipschits, Yuval Gadot and Matthew J. Adams).

The Shmunis Family Conversations in the Archaeology and History of Ancient Israel with Israel Finkelstein
The Shmunis Family Conversations in the Archaeology and History of Ancient Israel with Israel Finkelstein series is a YouTube series hosted by the W.F. Albright Institute of Archaeological Research's Albright Live YouTube Channel. As of September 2021, 26 episodes have been released. The series is set as an interview-style conversation between Albright Institute Director Matthew J. Adams and archaeologist Israel Finkelstein. Episodes cover the rise of Ancient Israel as evidenced by archaeology, ancient Near Eastern textual sources, the Bible, and archaeology from the Late Bronze Age through the Hellenistic Period. The episodes are written and directed by Israel Finkelstein and Matthew J. Adams with cinematography and editing by Yuval Pan. The series is Produced by Djehuti Productions and the Albright Institute with a grant from the Shmunis Family Foundation.

Awards and recognition 
Finkelstein is the Laureate of the Dan David Prize in 2005. The select committee noted that he is "widely regarded as a leading scholar in the archaeology of the Levant and as a foremost applicant of archaeological knowledge to reconstructing biblical Israelite history. He excels at creatively forging links between archaeology and the exact sciences and he has revolutionized many of these fields. … Finkelstein has had an impact on radically revising the history of Israel in the 10th and 9th centuries BCE. He has transformed the study of history and archaeology in Israeli universities, moving from a ‘monumental’ to a ‘systemic’ study of the archaeological evidence. He has taken what was becoming a rather staid and conservative discipline, with everyone in general agreement as to interpretation of excavation results, and has turned things upside down. … The study of these periods is never again going to be what it once was. … Israel Finkelstein has proven to be creative, generating scholarship no less than discussion, launching ideas and stimulating debates, fearlessly but with imagination and grace."

In 2014, Finkelstein was awarded the Prix Delalande Guérineau: Institut de France, l'Académie des Inscriptions et Belles-Lettres, for his book Le Royaume biblique oublié (The Forgotten Kingdom).

He is the recipient of the MacAllister Field Archaeology Award 2017 (The American Schools of Oriental Research).

His other awards include the French decoration of Chevalier de l’ordre des Arts et des Lettres, (2009) and the Doctorat honoris causa of the University of Lausanne (2010).

Criticism 
Finkelstein's theories about Saul, David and Solomon have been criticized by fellow archaeologists. Amihai Mazar described Finkelstein's Low Chronology proposal as "premature and unacceptable". Amnon Ben-Tor accused him of employing a “double standard”, citing the biblical text where it suited him and deploring its use where it did not. Other criticisms came from William G. Dever (who dismissed the Low Chronology as "idiosyncratic"), Lawrence Stager, Doron Ben-Ami, Raz Kletter and Anabel Zarzeki-Peleg. David Ussishkin, despite agreeing with many of Finkelstein's theories about the United Monarchy, has also shown doubts and reservations about Finkelstein's Low Chronology.

Writing in the Biblical Archaeology Review and subsequently in the Bulletin of the American Schools of Oriental Research, William G. Dever described The Bible Unearthed as a "convoluted story", writing that "This clever, trendy work may deceive lay readers". Ancient Near Eastern historian Kenneth Kitchen was also critical of the book, writing that "[A] careful critical perusal of this work—which certainly has much to say about both archaeology and the biblical writings—reveals that we are dealing very largely with a work of imaginative fiction, not a serious or reliable account of the subject", and "Their treatment of the exodus is among the most factually ignorant and misleading that this writer has ever read." Another evangelical, Richard Hess, also being critical, wrote that "The authors always present their interpretation of the archaeological data but do not mention or interact with contemporary alternative approaches. Thus the book is ideologically driven and controlled."

A 2004 debate between Finkelstein and William G. Dever, mediated by Hershel Shanks (editor of the Biblical Archaeology Review), quickly degenerated into insults, with Dever calling Finkelstein "idiosyncratic and doctrinaire" and Finkelstein dismissing Dever as a "jealous academic parasite". Dever later accused Finkelstein of supporting post-Zionism, to which Finkelstein replied by accusing Dever of being "a biblical literalist disguised as a liberal". Shanks described the exchange between the two as "embarrassing".

Following the publication of The Forgotten Kingdom, Dever once again harshly criticized Finkelstein: writing in the Biblical Archaeology Review, he described Finkelstein as "a magician and a showman". He stated that the book was full of "numerous errors, misrepresentations, over-simplifications and contradictions". Another, more moderate, review was written on the same magazine by Aaron Burke: while Burke described Finkelstein's book as "ambitious" and praised its literary style, he did not accept Finkelstein's conclusions. He stated that the book engages in several speculations that cannot be proved by archeology, biblical and extra-biblical sources. He also criticized Finkelstein for persistently trying to downgrade the role of David in the development of ancient Israel.

Other landmarks 
 Selected as one of the 10 most influential researchers in the history of archaeology in the Levant (a Swiss publication, 1993).
 Invited to the Salon du Livre in Paris, 2008. Two public debates there: with the French philosopher Armand Abécassis on La Bible et la Terre Sainte, and with the Israeli author Meir Shalev on la Bible de l’ecrivain et la Bible de l’archeologue.
 Keynote address in the Annual Meeting of the American Schools of Oriental Research, Nashville 2000.
 A ca. 50 pages profile chapter in J.-F. Mondot’s Une Bible pour deux mémoires (Paris 2006).
 Invited lecture in the special symposium celebrating the 60th anniversary of the Weizmann Institute (together with Nobel Prize laureates Ada Yonath and Daniel Kahneman, and Lord Wilson, 2009).
 Keynote address in the Symposium of Mediterranean Archaeology, Florence 2012.
 Two lectures in the Académie des Inscriptions et Belles Lettres, Paris, May 2012 and February 2016.
 Public lectures in events at universities such as the University of Chicago, Heidelberg University (2014) and Princeton University.
Joint session of the American Schools of Oriental Research and Society of Biblical Literature titled Rethinking Israel – celebrating the publication of Rethinking Israel, Studies in the History and Archaeology of Ancient Israel in Honr of Israel Finkelstein, Boston 2017.
Conversation with Israel Finkelstein and Thomas Romer, central evening event in the International Meeting of the Society for Biblical Literature, Rome, July 2019.

References

External links 
 Finkelstein's personal website: https://israelfinkelstein.wordpress.com/
 The Megiddo Expedition: https://megiddoexpedition.wordpress.com/
 The Kiriath-Jearim excavations: https://kiriathjearim.wordpress.com/
 The digitized epigraphy website: http://www-nuclear.tau.ac.il/~eip/ostraca/Home/Home.html
 Finkelstein's scholarly articles on academia.edu: https://telaviv.academia.edu/IsraelFinkelstein
 The Dan David prize, 2005: http://www.dandavidprize.org/laureates/2005/77-past-archaeology/173-prof-israel-finkelstein
 The Shmunis Family Conversations in the Archaeology and History of Ancient Israel with Israel Finkelstein, 2020–2021: https://www.youtube.com/playlist?list=PLvm7MPUI_WJclpUfZgCw1Tfd_cyT4Fh-f

1949 births
Living people
20th-century archaeologists
20th-century Israeli male writers
21st-century archaeologists
21st-century Israeli male writers
Biblical archaeologists
Historical geographers
Israeli archaeologists
Israeli Ashkenazi Jews
Israeli people of Ukrainian-Jewish descent
Academic staff of Tel Aviv University